Dundee (Scottish Gaelic: Dùn Dé) is a small community in the Canadian province of Nova Scotia, located in Richmond County on Cape Breton Island, and named after the city of Dundee in Scotland. Dundee is most known for the Dundee Resort and Golf Club, located on the West Bay.

Dundee Resort and Golf Club 
Located on the Bras d'Or Lakes, the resort offers gorgeous views along with plenty of actives to choose from. The resort was amongst the list of 20 Must See Places in National Geographic Traveler's Best of the World Guide in 2013.

Rooms/Cottages 
Rooms are available in the resort complex or cottages and vacation homes can be rented out on the property. Resort complex rooms offer a view of either the golf course of the Brad d'Or Lakes.
There are 18 cottages on site, varying from one bedroom units to three bedroom units. Located just off the 9th tee of the golf course, they offer desired views.

Activities 
There is an 18-hole golf course located on the resort grounds that offers gold lessons and putting green. Indoor and outdoor pool facilities and a sauna are located in the resort complex. Beach bonfires are offered throughout the tourist season and a lakeside adventure centre offers several activities including paddle boating, kayaking, canoeing, tennis, volleyball, beach swimming and water trampoline

Events 
The resort hosts several events throughout prime tourist season including meeting and weddings.

In January 2016, it was released that the resort would be put up for sale for an asking price of 2.5 million dollars.

Parks
Dundee Provincial Park

References

Dundee on Destination Nova Scotia

Communities in Richmond County, Nova Scotia